Fort Theater is a historic two-story building in Kearney, Nebraska. It was built in 1914 as The Empress by F.G. Keens, and designed in the Classical Revival style. After it was partly destroyed in 1940, it was purchased by Don and George Monroe, who added a marquee to the facade; it was designed in the Moderne style by architect Edward J. Sessinghaus. Inside, there are murals by Joyce Ballantyne. The building has been listed on the National Register of Historic Places since July 12, 2006.

References

National Register of Historic Places in Buffalo County, Nebraska
Neoclassical architecture in Nebraska
Moderne architecture in the United States
Buildings and structures completed in 1914
1914 establishments in Nebraska